The following is a list of individuals associated with the University of Vermont through attending as a student.

Notable alumni

Academia
 Henry Vernon Atherton, professor of Animal Science at the University of Vermont and pioneer in the dairy industry.
 Guy W. Bailey, Secretary of State of Vermont and President of the University of Vermont
 Frank M. Bryan, professor of Political Science.
 John Dewey, Class of 1879, pragmatist philosopher and educator.
 Berta Geller, Ed.D 1992, and research professor emeritus, University of Vermont College of Medicine.

Activism
 Jody Williams, Nobel Peace Prize Laureate for leading international action to ban land mines.

Arts
 Ben Affleck, actor and Academy Award-winning filmmaker (transferred to Occidental College).
 Trey Anastasio, guitarist in the band Phish; (transferred to Goddard College).
 Dierks Bentley, country music artist (attended UVM one year; graduated from Vanderbilt University).
 Mark Boone Junior aka Mark Heidrich, actor; best known for role as Bobby Munson on Sons of Anarchy and roles in Batman Begins and Memento.
 Jon Fishman, drummer in the band Phish
 David Franzoni, screenwriter of Gladiator, winner of 2001 Academy Award for Best Picture
 Mike Gordon, bassist in the band Phish
 Amr Kashmiri, Pakistani actor and musician.
 Ella Seaver Owen (1852–1910), artist, teacher
 Theodora Agnes Peck, novelist and poet
 Susan Powers, American folk artist.
 E. Annie Proulx, Pulitzer Prize-winning author of The Shipping News and Brokeback Mountain.
 Barbara Rachko, American artist and author.
 Jessica Seinfeld, author and cook.
 Gail Sheehy, author.
 Kerr Smith, actor best known for playing Jack McPhee on the television drama Dawson's Creek.
 Michael A. Stackpole, science fiction and fantasy author best known for his Star Wars and BattleTech books.
 Rupert von Trapp, member of the Trapp Family Singers

Business
 Frederick H. Billings, Lawyer and financier. From 1879 to 1881 he was President of the Northern Pacific Railway.
 Daniel Burke, former President of the American Broadcasting Company (ABC)
 Julius Yemans Dewey, Physician, founder of the National Life Insurance Company. Father of the only Admiral of the Navy in U.S. history, George Dewey.
 Brian Halligan, CEO and co-founder of HubSpot and author
 Dr. H. Nelson Jackson; businessman, physician, and senior officer of the Organized Reserves who carried out the first coast-to-coast automobile trip in the U.S. He was a World War I recipient of the Distinguished Service Cross and a national vice-commander of The American Legion, 1921–1922.
 William F. Ruprecht, President and CEO, Sotheby's

Government and politics
 Consuelo Northrup Bailey, first woman admitted to practice before the U.S. Supreme Court, serve as Speaker of the Vermont House, and be elected a state Lieutenant Governor (1955–1959). Vice-chair of the Republican National Committee from 1952 to 1956.
 Christopher A. Bray, member of the Vermont House of Representatives and Vermont Senate
 Sarah E. Buxton, (2000), Member, Vermont House of Representatives, former member, UVM Board of Trustees
 Pedro Albizu Campos (1912–1913), Puerto Rican political leader, orator, lawyer and humanist; was either President or Honorary President of the Puerto Rican Nationalist Party from 1930 until his death in 1965.
 Matthew Choate 1992, Vermont state senator 2008-2010
 Jacob Collamer, Class of 1810; Member United States House of Representatives and United States Senate; United States Postmaster General; Associate Justice of the Vermont Supreme Court.
 Grace Coolidge, First Lady of the United States 1923–1929.
 Jedd Philo Clark Cottrill, Class of 1852, Member, Wisconsin State Senate.
 Louis F. Dow, mayor of Burlington, Vermont, 1935-1939
 Brian Dubie; Vermont's 85th Lieutenant Governor, 2003–2011.
Molly Gray, Lieutenant governor of Vermont
 Aaron H. Grout, Vermont Secretary of State
 Isaac R. Harrington, mayor of Buffalo, New York
 Donly C. Hawley, mayor of Burlington, Vermont
 Hollister Jackson, Lieutenant Governor of Vermont who died in the Great Flood of 1927.
 Madeleine Kunin, former Governor of Vermont; former U.S. Ambassador to Switzerland; former Deputy Secretary of Education, U.S. Dept. of Education
 James O'Halloran, Canadian politician
 John Eugene Osborne, Third Governor of Wyoming and United States Representative from Wyoming
 Hamilton S. Peck, mayor of Burlington, state legislator, city court judge
 H. Henry Powers, United States Congressman
 Theodore Prentiss, Member, Wisconsin State Assembly
 Frederick M. Reed, Vermont Attorney General
 Robert Roberts, mayor of Burlington, Vermont
 Phil Scott, Governor of Vermont.
 George R. Vincent, physician and Greenback Party politician in Wisconsin
 Charles W. Waterman, US Senator from Colorado, donated funds for construction of UVM's Waterman Building, UVM trustee 1921–1925, presented honorary degree of LL.D. in 1922.
 William Almon Wheeler, Vice-President of the United States, attended for two years (1837-1839), presented honorary degree of LL.D. in 1867, Bachelor of Arts (as in course) in 1876.
Susanne R. Young, Vermont Attorney General beginning in June 2022

Journalism
 Jack Arute, ABC and ESPN sideline reporter.
 Louisa Hodge, television reporter
 Henry Jarvis Raymond, Co-Founder of the New York Times and Harper's New Monthly Magazine
 Ryen Russillo, Host of The Ryen Russillo Show on The Ringer podcast network, Former Co-host of the ESPN sports talk radio show 'SVP & Russillo' and 'Rusillo & Kanell', host of ESPN Radio's 'College Gameday.'

Law and courts
 Asa O. Aldis, Associate Justice of the Vermont Supreme Court
 John S. Buttles, (1897), Associate Justice of the Vermont Supreme Court
 Harold "Duke" Eaton Jr., Justice of the Vermont Supreme Court.
 Benjamin F. Fifield, lawyer who served as United States Attorney for the District of Vermont from 1869-1880
 Seneca Haselton, mayor of Burlington, U.S. Minister to Venezuela, Associate Justice of the Vermont Supreme Court
 William C. Hill (M.A., 1968), Associate Justice of the Vermont Supreme Court
 Benjamin N. Hulburd, Chief Justice of the Vermont Supreme Court.
 George M. Powers, Chief Justice of the Vermont Supreme Court
 John C. Sherburne, Vermont's first Rhodes Scholar and Chief Justice of the Vermont Supreme Court
 Allen R. Sturtevant, Associate Justice of the Vermont Supreme Court
 Charles Tetzlaff, United States Attorney for the District of Vermont.

Medicine
 Frederick M. "Skip" Burkle Jr., Robert Larner College of Medicine (1965), humanitarian assistance & disaster response specialist

Military
 Brigadier General Donald H. Balch, United States Air Force general.
 Brigadier General Jedediah Hyde Baxter, son of Portus Baxter and Surgeon General of the United States Army
 Brigadier General Reginald W. Buzzell (attended, Class of 1918), National Guard officer whose commands included the 43rd Infantry Division.
 Lieutenant General Lewis A. Craparotta, United States Marine Corps 
 Major General Steven A. Cray, Adjutant General of Vermont, March, 2013 to March 2019.
 Major General Thomas E. Drew, Adjutant General of Vermont, August, 2012 to March 2013.
 Lieutenant General Michael Dubie, former Deputy Commander of United States Northern Command and former Vermont Adjutant General.
 Lieutenant General Edward J. O'Neill, commander of First United States Army
 Brigadier General Wayne H. Page, Adjutant General of the Vermont National Guard
 Brigadier General James Stevens Peck, Union Army officer in the American Civil War who later served as Adjutant General of the Vermont National Guard
 Brigadier General William Smith,  Paymaster-General of the United States Army

Religion
 Fishel Jacobs, Martial artist, legal author, speaker.
 Samuel Worcester, missionary to the Cherokees in Georgia and later in Indian Territory during early 19th Century.

Science
 Duane Graveline, astronaut.
 Henry Farnham Perkins, zoologist and eugenicist.

Sports
 Barbara Cochran, Class of 1978; alpine ski racer, won the gold medal in the slalom in the 1972 Winter Olympics.
 Ray Collins, Class of 1909, Boston Red Sox pitcher (1909–15) and later coached for UVM. Started the first World Series game at Fenway Park in 1912. Indoor track facility named for him and Larry Gardner.
 Larry Gardner, Class of 1909; Major League third baseman for 17 years (1908–24) for the Boston Red Sox, Philadelphia Athletics and Cleveland Indians. Played on four World Champions, and later coached and served as the athletic director at UVM. Indoor track facility named for him and Ray Collins.
 Albert Gutterson, Gold medal winner in long jump in 1912 Summer Olympics. Hockey facility, Gutterson Fieldhouse is named after him.
 Billy Kidd, alpine ski racer, 1964 Olympic silver medalist, raced for UVM before joining the U.S. Ski Team.
 Jack Lamabe, Major League pitcher for several different teams over seven seasons including the 1967 World Champion St. Louis Cardinals.
 John LeClair, member of the 1992–93 Stanley Cup winning Montreal Canadiens. Has three 50 goals seasons in the NHL. Former member of the Philadelphia Flyers and Pittsburgh Penguins.
 Rollie Massimino, Class of 1956. Longtime college basketball coach who led the Villanova University Men's Basketball team to the 1985 NCAA Championship.
 Kirk McCaskill, Major League pitcher for the California Angels and Chicago White Sox.
 Torrey Mitchell, NHL center for the Buffalo Sabres.
 Éric Perrin, an NHL forward for the Tampa Bay Lightning when they won the Stanley Cup in 2004.
 Martin St. Louis, three-time NCAA All-American winger. Four-time NHL All-Star and NHL Hart Memorial Trophy and Lady Byng Trophy winner. Won the Stanley Cup with the Tampa Bay Lightning in the 2003–04 Season.
 Zack Scott, General Manager of the New York Mets
 Patrick Sharp, NHL hockey player. Attended UVM.
 Viktor Stålberg, winger for the Nashville Predators. 2009 NCAA All-American, 2013 Stanley Cup champion. Attended UVM.
 Tim Thomas, goaltender and two-time Vezina Trophy winner for the Boston Bruins. Won the Stanley Cup and Conn Smythe Trophy with the Bruins in the 2010–11 Season.
 Frank Trigilio, American football player

Other
 H. H. Holmes, American serial killer, attended in 1879 and 1880.

References 

 
University of Vermont